The Road Rage Tour is a concert tour co-headlined by The New Cars and Blondie in the North America in 2006.

Background
The Road Rage Tour was The New Cars first tour, the first time an incarnation of The Cars has toured in seventeen years. VH-1 Classic sponsored the tour, and commercials were aired frequently on VH-1 and its sister channels to draw attention to the tour.

The tour featured a unique internet promotion. With each online ticket purchase through VH1classic.com or Ticketmaster.com a full album The New Cars and Blondie: Road Rage was offered to free download from eMusic.com. The album included five songs performed by The New Cars (four classic songs of The Cars, recorded live and the newly penned studio track "Not Tonight") and five songs performed by Blondie (four previously unreleased live tracks and one new studio cover of Roxy Music hit "More than This"). Currently eMusic offers a shortened version of the album in a form of 4 track EP.

Set
The New Cars set was reportedly designed by drummer Prairie Prince. It featured large, circular, metallic rings with screens in them suspended above the stage. The rings were meant to resemble a stop light. The drummer sat in a large glowing ring, and the keyboards were elevated behind the center of the stage. The set was concealed when Blondie performed by a large black tarp, meant to resemble the New York City skyline.

Tour cancellation
On June 5, 2006, the driver of The New Cars' tour bus swerved to avoid a collision with a vehicle, resulting in the New Cars' guitarist Elliot Easton suffering a broken left clavicle.  Easton played four more shows despite the injury, but when it became apparent that he needed surgery, the rest of the tour was cancelled.  Easton had surgery in New York on June 12.

Set list

Tour dates

Notes
A^ This show was Blondie only without The New Cars

Cancelled dates

Road Rage Winter Tour
After the original tour cancellation The New Cars and Blondie went separate ways. Blondie went on short tour to Asia in September with single stops in USA before and after, while The New Cars continued the Road Rage tour in winter without Blondie with Persephone's Bees as a supporting act. The winter dates were scheduled to be of much smaller, theatre, venues, than large-scale arenas of the summer leg. Kasim Sulton was not featured on several shows due to his touring with Meat Loaf in support of Bat Out of Hell III: The Monster Is Loose album with Atom Ellis filling for him.

Promotion
VIP Tickets, a popular feature during the summer tour, was available for most venues of the winter leg, with the exclusion of the Count Basie Theatre in Red Bank. Reserved fan-club seating was also available at most venues, except the Count Basie. A ticket pre-sale began on September 18, 2006. Ticketmaster supplied the tickets for most of the venues, although Seatadvisor and various box offices did carry tickets for others.

Personnel
Blondie
 Debbie Harry – vocals
 Chris Stein – guitars
 Clem Burke – drums
 Kevin Patrick – keyboards
 Leigh Foxx – bass
 Paul Carbonara – guitars

The New Cars
 Todd Rundgren – lead vocals, rhythm guitar
 Elliot Easton – lead guitar, backing vocals
 Greg Hawkes – keyboards, backing vocals
 Kasim Sulton – bass guitar, lead and backing vocals
 Prairie Prince – drums, percussion

References

2006 concert tours
Blondie (band) concert tours